Damian Kindler (born May 31, 1968) is a television and film writer, director and producer. Born in Melbourne, Australia, Kindler's family swiftly emigrated to Toronto, Canada, where he was raised. He currently resides in Venice, California, US.

Career

Kindler worked on MGM Television's Stargate SG-1 and Stargate: Atlantis television series. He joined the Stargate production team at the start of Stargate SG-1's sixth season, eventually becoming a co-executive producer for the series.

In May 2007, Kindler launched the independent web series Sanctuary, which was then picked up for television by The Movie Network in Canada and Syfy in the United States. The show ran for four seasons with Kindler serving as showrunner and director.

Kindler subsequently joined FOX's Sleepy Hollow acting as executive producer and writer for three seasons.

Currently, Kindler is the executive producer and showrunner of the Syfy Channel television series Krypton, produced with David S. Goyer, DC Entertainment, and Warner Horizon Television.

On September 28, 2018, it was announced that Netflix had given order for the production of the science-fiction horror drama series October Faction. Kindler is set to serve as the primary showrunner for the series.

Kindler formerly played left wing for the Thunder, a North Vancouver hockey team, which he recently retired from. He is also one of the founders of Sanctuary for Kids, a foundation that supports children's charities around the world.

Filmography

References

External links

Living people
1968 births
Canadian male screenwriters
Writers from Melbourne
Writers from Toronto
Australian emigrants to Canada
Film producers from Ontario
21st-century Canadian screenwriters